Delonix regia is a species of flowering plant in the bean family Fabaceae, subfamily Caesalpinioideae native to Madagascar. It is noted for its fern-like leaves and flamboyant display of orange-red flowers over summer. In many tropical parts of the world it is grown as an ornamental tree and in English it is given the name royal poinciana, flamboyant, phoenix flower, flame of the forest, or flame tree (one of several species given this name).

This species was previously placed in the genus Poinciana, named for Phillippe de Longvilliers de Poincy, the 17th-century governor of Saint Christopher (Saint Kitts). It is a non-nodulating legume.

Description

They appear in corymbs along and at the ends of branches. The naturally occurring variety flavida (Bengali: Radhachura) has yellow flowers. The pods are green and flaccid when young and turn dark-brown and woody. The compound (doubly pinnate) leaves have a feathery appearance and are a characteristic light, bright green. Pollen grains are elongated, approximately 52 µm in size.

Distribution

Delonix regia is endemic to Madagascar's dry deciduous forests, but has been introduced into tropical and sub-tropical regions worldwide. In the wild it is endangered, but it is widely cultivated elsewhere and is regarded as naturalised in many of the locations where it is grown:

North America
In the continental United States, it grows in South Florida, Central Florida, and in the Rio Grande Valley of South Texas. It also grows in humid parts of Mexico, especially in the Yucatan peninsula.

Caribbean and Central America
In the Caribbean it is featured in many Dominican and Puerto Rican paintings. It can also be found in Belize, The Bahamas, Cuba, Haiti, Dominican Republic, Nicaragua, U.S. Virgin Islands, Sint Maarten,Trinidad and Tobago, Cayman Islands, Grenada, Jamaica, Curaçao and Saint Vincent And The Grenadines. It is the national flower of St. Kitts and Nevis. It can also be found in Bermuda, and Hawaii.

South America
It grows in Paraguay, Guyana and Brazil.

Europe and the Middle East
Delonix regia is planted in Mediterranean parts of Europe, the Middle East and North Africa, including the southern coast of Spain, the Valencian coast, the Canary Islands, Lebanon, Egypt, Iran, Israel, Jordan and Cyprus.

Indian subcontinent

The tree is planted in India, where it is referred to as the May-flower tree, Gulmohar or Gul Mohr. In West Bengal, and Odisha it is called Krishna Chura (কৃষ্ণচূড়া/କୃଷ୍ଣଚୂଡ଼ା). In Sri Lanka it is known in Sinhala as the Maara tree, although for a short while it was known as the Lamaasuriya tree after Le Mesurier, the British civil servant who was responsible for introducing it as a shade tree. It is also grown in Karachi, Pakistan. In Mauritius and La Réunion it announces the coming of the new year.

In Bangladesh it known as krisnachura(কৃষ্ণচূড়া). You can find this tree in various places of Bangladesh. It is found all over Dhaka City and is one of iconic symbols of the Bengali month of Boishakh.

Southeast Asia
In Myanmar, where it is called Sein-pann-ni, the time of flowering is March in the south and early to late April in the north. It is planted in gardens and as a roadside tree. In Myanmar, this tree is a sign of Thingyan Festival (13–16/17 April). In the Philippines, its flowering signals the imminent arrival of the monsoon rains. It also grows in Thailand and Indonesia. In Vietnam it is called "phoenix flower" and mostly grows in Haiphong. In Malaysia, it is called "Semarak", used to be the name of a street in the country's capital city, Kuala Lumpur, now renamed as Jalan Sultan Yahya Petra where one of the oldest and highest rank Malaysian university, University of Technology Malaysia's Kuala Lumpur campus is located. "Semarak Api" is also the official flower of the Sepang district.

East Asia

It grows in Southern China such as in Hong Kong. It is the official tree in Tainan, Taiwan; Xiamen, Fujian Province, and Shantou, Guangdong Province, People's Republic of China. National Cheng Kung University, a university located in Tainan, put royal poinciana on its emblem.

Australia
It is very widely grown in the Northern Australia, the southern extremes previously limited to South East Queensland where it is a popular street tree in the suburbs of Brisbane. It now grows and blooms successfully in Sydney and other parts of New South Wales.

Micronesia
It grows in Guam, and is the official tree of the Commonwealth of the Northern Mariana Islands.

Cultivation

Required conditions
The royal poinciana requires a tropical or near-tropical climate, but can tolerate drought and salty conditions. It prefers an open, free-draining sandy or loamy soil enriched with organic matter. The tree does not like heavy or clay soils and flowers more profusely when kept slightly dry.

Propagation

Seeds

The royal poinciana is most commonly propagated by seeds. Seeds are collected, soaked in warm water for at least 24 hours, and planted in warm, moist soil in a semi-shaded, sheltered position. In lieu of soaking, the seeds can also be "nicked" or "pinched" (with a small scissors or nail clipper) and planted immediately. These two methods allow moisture to penetrate the tough outer casing, stimulating germination. The seedlings grow rapidly and can reach  in a few weeks under ideal conditions.

Cuttings
Less common, but just as effective, is propagation by semi-hardwood cuttings. Branches consisting of the current or last season's growth can be cut into  sections and planted in a moist potting mixture. This method is slower than seed propagation (cuttings take a few months to root) but is the preferred method for ensuring new trees are true to form. As such, cuttings are a particularly common method of propagation for the rarer yellow-flowering variety of the tree.

Usefulness
In addition to its ornamental value, it is also a useful shade tree in tropical conditions, because it usually grows to a modest height (mostly , but it can reach a maximum height of ) but spreads widely, and its dense foliage provides full shade. In areas with a marked dry season, it sheds its leaves during the drought, but in other areas it is virtually evergreen.

Cultural significance
In the Indian state of Kerala, royal poinciana is called kaalvarippoo which means "the flower of Calvary". There is a popular belief among Saint Thomas Christians of Kerala that when Jesus was crucified, there was a small royal poinciana tree nearby his Cross. It is believed that the blood of Jesus Christ was shed over the flowers of the tree and this is how the flowers of royal poinciana got a sharp red color. It is also known as Vaaga in many areas of Kerala.

Its blossom is the national flower of St. Kitts and Nevis, and in May 2018 the royal poinciana was adopted by the city of Key West as its official tree.

In Vietnam, this tree is called , or "phoenix's tail", and is a popular urban tree in much of Vietnam. Its flowering season is May–July, which coincides with the end of the school year in Vietnam. Because of this timing, the flower of poinciana is sometimes called the "pupil's flower". The tree is also commonly found on school grounds in Vietnam, however after several incidents where a tree has fallen onto students, with one student killed, schools started cutting down or severely pruning the trees. Hải Phòng is nicknamed  ("City of red poinciana").

The song "Poinciana" was inspired by the presence of this tree in Cuba.

References

Further reading
 Floridata data base
 ARKive – images and movies of the flame tree (Delonix regia)

External links

 Scientific information about Delonix regia
 
 

regia
Endemic flora of Madagascar
Ornamental trees
Decorative fruits and seeds
Taxa named by Wenceslas Bojer
Taxa named by William Jackson Hooker
Taxa named by Constantine Samuel Rafinesque